The Johannine epistles, the Epistles of John, or the Letters of John are three of the catholic epistles of the New Testament, thought to have been written between 85 and 100 AD. Most scholars agree that all three letters are written by the same author, although there is debate on who that author is.

First

This epistle, unlike the other two, is written more as a sermon, one to help strengthen people's faith in Jesus, to help them understand why a being as great as the Son of God would have a mortal life and a mortal's agonizing death.

Second

This epistle is written as a short letter from "the elder" to an unnamed "elect lady" whom he loves and her children. Within the letter, John warns about opening her home to false teachers and to always practice truth, avoiding secrecy.

Third

The third epistle, also a short letter from "the elder", is addressed to a man named Gaius and mentioned as "a dear friend". It talks about a man named Diotrephes whom Gaius excommunicated from the church and had gone on to create an anti-missionary sentiment, trying to get the church to stop receiving missionaries. It is believed that the letter was delivered by a third person, Demetrius.

See also
 Authorship of the Johannine works
 Johannine Christianity
 Johannine Comma
 Johannine literature

References 

John0
Epistle0